Wanderbiltia is a monotypic moth genus in the family Erebidae. Its only species, Wanderbiltia wanderbilti, is found in Brazil. Both the genus and species were first described by Alfredo Rei do Régo Barros in 1958.

References

Phaegopterina
Monotypic moth genera
Moths described in 1958